Sphenomorphus tetradactylus  is a species of skink found in Vietnam.

References

tetradactylus
Reptiles described in 2005
Taxa named by Ilya Darevsky
Taxa named by Nikolai Loutseranovitch Orlov
Reptiles of Vietnam